Herman Alexander de By (16 February 1873 – 24 February 1961) was a Dutch swimmer. He competed in the men's 200 metre freestyle event at the 1900 Summer Olympics.

References

External links
 

1873 births
1961 deaths
Dutch male freestyle swimmers
Olympic swimmers of the Netherlands
Swimmers at the 1900 Summer Olympics
Swimmers from Rotterdam